Comapa (from Nahuatl Komapan, "in the river of pots") is a municipality in the Mexican state of Veracruz, located about  south of the state capital Xalapa.

Geography
The municipality of Comapa is located in the Gulf of Mexico lowlands of central Veracruz. It borders the municipalities of Puente Nacional and Tlacotepec de Mejía to the north, Totutla to the northwest, Sochiapa to the west, Huatusco to the southwest, Zentla to the south, Soledad de Doblado to the southeast, and Paso de Ovejas to the northeast.

The northern border of the municipality mostly follows the Paso Limón and Panoaya Rivers. The Panoaya (from Nahuatl Panohaya, "place where the waters pass") is an upper tributary of the Paso de Ovejas River, which itself meets the La Antigua River at La Antigua. The municipality's southern border is mostly made up by the Chavaxtla and Paso Lagartos Rivers, both tributaries of the Jamapa River.

Comapa's climate is generally warm and subhumid with rain in the summer.

History
In pre-Hispanic times the Totonac people built a fort at Comapa. Local tradition has it that Comapa was one of the places where Guadalupe Victoria hid during his guerilla campaign in the Mexican War of Independence.

On 28 March 1831, Comapa became a municipality in the canton of Huatusco in the state of Veracruz. It became a free municipality on 15 January 1918.

Administration
The municipal government comprises a president, a councillor (Spanish: síndico), and a trustee (regidor). The current president of the municipality is Carmen Cantón Croda.

Demographics
In the 2010 Mexican Census, the municipality of Comapa recorded a population of 18,713 inhabitants living in 4382 households. It recorded a population of 19,859 inhabitants in the 2015 Intercensal Survey. 

There are 67 localities in the municipality, of which two are classified as urban:
 The municipal seat, also called Comapa, which recorded a population of 1421 inhabitants in the 2010 Census; and
 Boca del Monte, which recorded 4832 inhabitants in 2010.

Agriculture
Crops grown in the municipality include coffee, corn and sugarcane. Comapa is known for its comapeño peppers, a small orange variety eaten fresh or dried.

References

Municipalities of Veracruz
1831 establishments in Mexico
States and territories established in 1831